Zgornje Jarše is a settlement on the right bank of the Kamnik Bistrica River north of Domžale and east of Mengeš in the Upper Carniola region of Slovenia.

References

External links
Zgornje Jarše on Geopedia

Populated places in the Municipality of Domžale